Wilson Muruli Mukasa (born 5 July 1952) is a Ugandan politician. He has been Cabinet Minister of Public Service in the Ugandan Cabinet since 6 June 2016. He has previously served as Cabinent Minister of Gender and Social Issues from 1 March 2015, until 6 June 2016. Previously he served as Minister of Security from 27 May 2011 until 1 March 2015. Muruli Mukasa also serves as the Member of Parliament for Budyebo County in  Nakasongola District.

Background and education
He was born in Nakasongola District on 5 July 1952. He attend local elementary and secondary schools. He studied at Makerere University earning the combined degree/diploma of Bachelor of Arts with the Diploma in Education (BA.Dip.Ed.) in 1975. In 1987, he earned the Certificate in Hotel Management, from an undisclosed institution in Tripoli, Libya.

Career
For eleven years, from 1975 until 1986, Muruli Mukasa was a teacher; for the last two years he was the principal of the school where he taught. Since 1989, he has been a member of parliament, representing his home constituency. He was appointed Minister of Security in May 2011. He replaced Amama Mbabazi, who was appointed Prime Minister of Uganda. In addition to his docket of Security, Mukasa has served as Minister for Kampala, before a substantive minister was appointed in 2011, and in 2014, when the line Minister, Frank Tumwebaze, took a leave of absence. In a cabinet reshuffle on 1 March 2015, he was transferred to the post of Minister of Gender and Social Issues, replacing Mary Karooro Okurut, who was named Minister for Security. On 6 June 2016, he was named Cabinet Minister for Public Service, in the cabinet list announced that day.

See also
Cabinet of Uganda
Parliament of Uganda
Nakasongola District

References

External links
Full of List of Ugandan Cabinet Ministers May 2011
UPDF Ready To Shoot Down Sudan War Planes

Living people
1952 births
Government ministers of Uganda
Makerere University alumni
Members of the Parliament of Uganda
People from Nakasongola District
Ganda people
National Resistance Movement politicians
21st-century Ugandan politicians